Autumn on the Rhine is a 1928 German silent film directed by Siegfried Philippi and starring Albert Steinrück, Otto Reinwald and Julius Brandt.

The film's sets were designed by the art director Botho Hoefer.

Cast

References

Bibliography

External links

1928 films
Films of the Weimar Republic
Films directed by Siegfried Philippi
German silent feature films
German black-and-white films